Government of Pedro Sánchez may refer to:

First government of Pedro Sánchez (2018–2020)
Second government of Pedro Sánchez (2020–present)